CHWO may stand for:

 Children's Hospital of Western Ontario, now known as the Children's Hospital at London Health Sciences Centre
 CHWO, a radio station in the Greater Toronto Area that now has the call sign CFZM.